Gisela Dulko and Flavia Pennetta were the defending champions, but chose not to compete.
Sabine Lisicki and Samantha Stosur were the champions, defeating Kristina Barrois and Jasmin Wöhr in the final.

Seeds

Draw

Draw

References
 Main Draw

Porsche Tennis Grand Prix - Doubles
Doubles 2011